Pierre Vallières ( – ) was a Québécois journalist and writer, known as an intellectual leader of the Front de libération du Québec (FLQ). He was the author of the essay Nègres blancs d'Amérique, translated as White Niggers of America, which likened the struggles of French-Canadians to those of African-Americans.

Biography

Early life
Pierre Vallières was born on 22 February 1938, in Montreal, Quebec into a French-Canadian family. Vallières grew up in Ville Jacques-Cartier (now part of Longueuil) in the South Shore region, considered one of the most deprived areas of the Montreal metropolitan area. He entered the Franciscan Order. but left after a couple of years.  He worked in a bookstore before becoming a journalist, first for Le Devoir, and then for Cité Libre, for which he later became the director. He then went to cover international news for La Presse.

FLQ and White Niggers of America
Vallières had been working for La Presse for two years when he was fired for taking part in "subversive activities", having become a left-wing political activist at a young age. In September 1964, Vallières and Charles Gagnon published of the first issue of left-wing Révolution québécoise magazine. In July 1965, Vallières and Gagnon led the "Fourth Wave" of the Front de libération du Québec (FLQ), a separatist and Marxist-Leninist paramilitary group in Quebec, when they combined the remains of the "Third Wave" with their Popular Liberation Movement. Vallières published the group's newspaper, La Cognée ("The Hit"), and was involved in militant activities. The FLQ's bombing campaign prompted a quick clampdown by Canadian authorities, and by August 1966, the Royal Canadian Mounted Police (RCMP) had arrested many FLQ members.

Vallières escaped the arrests and fled to the United States with Gagnon, where they conducted a hunger strike at the United Nations headquarters in New York City to protest what was considered to be Quebec's plight in Canada. While in New York, Vallières was held in the Manhattan House of Detention for Men before being extradited back to Canada, where he was immediately arrested in connection with the robbery of a Montreal cinema on 27 August 1966. Vallières, along with Charles Gagnon and five other people, was convicted of the manslaughter of Thérèse Morin, a 64-year-old secretary who died in the explosion of a bomb that was delivered to the H.B. La Grenade shoe manufacturer in Montreal on 5 May 1966, and of Jean Corbo, a 16-year-old FLQ member who died on 14 July 1966 in the explosion of the bomb he had placed himself at the Dominion Textile factory in Montreal. Vallières received a life sentence for the deaths but the conviction was overturned by the court of appeal, and in a second trial held in 1969, he was convicted again and this time sentenced to 30 months in prison. He was paroled on 26 May 1970 after spending 44 months in prison.

Vallières wrote a number of works during his four-month imprisonment in New York in 1967, the most famous of which was Nègres blancs d'Amérique (1968), translated into English as White Niggers of America. The book compared the historical situation of French-Canadians to that of African-Americans at the height of the latter's civil rights struggles, where Vallières argued the parallels between the two peoples as an exploited lower class, and called for armed struggle of liberation against their common aristocratic oppressors.

Later life and death
In 1970, during the October Crisis, the FLQ abducted and murdered Pierre Laporte, the Vice-Premier of Quebec. The following year, Vallières renounced violence as a means to achieve Quebec independence, and on 4 October 1972, under a plea bargain agreement, received a one-year suspended sentence on three charges of counselling kidnapping for political purposes. Vallières then resumed his career as a journalist, writer, and publisher.

Vallières died from heart failure on 23 December 1998, at the Jacques-Viger Hospital in Montreal.

Works

Nègres blancs d'Amérique, autobiographie précoce d'un " terroriste " québécois. Montréal : Éditions Parti pris, 1967 (translated as White Niggers of America: The Precocious Autobiography of a Quebec Terrorist by Joan Pinkham, Monthly Review Press, 1971 and McClelland & Stewart, 1972)
Vivre sans temps morts, jouir sans entraves!  Paris, 1970
L'urgence de choisir.  Montréal Parti-Pris, 1971; (translated as Choose!, New Press, 1972 )
Pour un front commun multinational de libération.  with Charles Gagnon. S.l. : Front de libération du Québec, 1971
Un Québec impossible.  Montréal : Éditions Québec/Amérique, 1977 (translated as The Impossible Quebec: Illusions of Sovereignty Association, 1980)
L'exécution de Pierre Laporte : les dessous de l'Opération.  Montréal : Éditions Québec/Amérique, 1977 (translated as The Assassination of Pierre Laporte by Ralph Wells, Lorimer, 1977)
Les scorpions associés.  with René Lévesque. Montréal : Éditions Québec-Amérique, 1978
La démocratie ingouvernable.  Montréal : Québec/Amérique, 1979
La liberté en friche.  Montréal : Éditions Québec/Amérique, 1979
Changer de société.  with Serge Proulx. Montréal : Québec/Amérique, 1982
Les héritiers de Papineau : itinéraire politique d'un "nègre blanc" (1960–1985).  Montréal, Québec : Québec/Amérique, 1986
Noces obscures. Montréal : L'Hexagone, 1986
Le devoir de résistance. Montréal : VLB, 1994
Paroles d'un nègre blanc. with Jacques Jourdain and Mélanie Mailhot. Montréal : VLB éditeur, 2002

Film

Freedom Outraged Vallières plays himself in a documentary by the National Film Board of Canada directed by Jean-Daniel Lafond. A 16-mm medium length, color, 1994.

Bibliography
Antaya, Felipe, Pierre Vallières ou le danger d'occulter le passé, master's thesis, Université du Québec à Trois-Rivières, Trois-Rivières, 2011, 108 p.
Baillargeon, Constantin, Pierre Vallières vu par son "professeur de philosophie", Médiaspaul, Montréal, 2002, 128 p. 
Binamé, Charles, and Thériault, Normand, Pierre Vallières, television broadcast, Radio-Québec, 1974, 60 minutes
Gignac, Benoit, Québec 68 : l'année révolution, Éditions La Presse, Montréal, 2008, 272 p. 
Jourdain, Jacques, De Cité Libre à L'urgence de choisir : Pierre Vallières et les palinodies de la gauche québécoise, master's thesis, Université du Québec à Montréal, Montréal, 1995, 115 p.
Jourdain, Jacques, and Mailhot, Mélanie, Vallières : Paroles d'un nègre blanc, VLB éditeur, Montréal, 2002, 286 p. 
Samson-Legault, Daniel, Dissident : Pierre Vallières (1938–1998), Éditions Québec Amérique, Montréal, 2018, 497 p., 
Tétreault, Paul, A suggested framework for the study of perceptions of violence and its application to the writings of Pierre Trudeau and Pierre Vallières, master's thesis, McGill University, Montréal, 1971, 106 p.

Notes

External links
"Does the FLQ Exist?" by Pierre Vallières
A brief essay on The Execution of Pierre Laporte

1938 births
1998 deaths
Canadian political writers
Canadian gay writers
Writers from Montreal
People from Longueuil
Canadian non-fiction writers in French
Front de libération du Québec members
People extradited from the United States
People extradited to Canada
Canadian people convicted of manslaughter
Quebec sovereigntists
20th-century Canadian LGBT people